A number of steamships were named St Margaret, including –

, a British cargo ship torpedoed and sunk in 1917,
, a British cargo ship torpedoed and sunk in 1943,
, a British cargo ship in service 1946–60

Ship names